Marmaduke Blennerhassett may refer to:

Sir Marmaduke Charles Henry Joseph Blennerhassett, 6th Baronet (1902–1940) of the Blennerhassett Baronets
Sir (Marmaduke) Adrian Francis William Blennerhassett, 7th Baronet (1940–2022) of the Blennerhassett Baronets

See also
Blennerhassett (disambiguation)